Víctor Andrés Guzmán Olmedo (born 7 March 2002), also known as Toro, is a Mexican professional footballer who plays as a centre-back for Liga MX club Monterrey.

Club career
On 21 January 2020, Guzmán made his professional debut with Tijuana in a Copa MX Round of 16 match against Atlético San Luis in a 1–0 victory, coming on as a substitute. On 25 July, he made his Liga MX debut against Atlas in a 3–1 victory.

International career

Youth
Guzmán was part of the under-17 squad that participated at the 2019 CONCACAF U-17 Championship, where Mexico won the competition. He also participated at the 2019 U-17 World Cup, where Mexico finished runner-up.

Guzmán was called up by Raúl Chabrand to participate with the under-21 team at the 2022 Maurice Revello Tournament, scoring one goal, where Mexico finished the tournament in third place.

Career statistics

Club

Honours
Mexico U17
CONCACAF U-17 Championship: 2019
FIFA U-17 World Cup runner-up: 2019

Individual
Liga MX Best Rookie: 2020–21
Liga MX All-Star: 2021

References

2002 births
Living people
Mexican footballers
Mexico youth international footballers
Association football defenders
Club Tijuana footballers
Sportspeople from Tijuana
Footballers from Baja California